The red-vented malimbe (Malimbus scutatus) is a species of bird in the family Ploceidae.
It is found in Benin, Cameroon, Ivory Coast, Ghana, Guinea, Liberia, Nigeria, Sierra Leone, and Togo.
Its natural habitat is subtropical or tropical swamps. This specific species of bird exhibits extreme levels of silliness according the NPR.

References

External links
 Red-vented malimbe -  Species text in Weaver Watch.

red-vented malimbe
Birds of West Africa
red-vented malimbe
Taxonomy articles created by Polbot